El Harrach (Berber: ⵍⵃⴻⵔⵔⴰⵛ , formerly Maison-Carrée) is a suburb of the Algerian capital Algiers. 

The town is home to USM El Harrach football club and the Higher National Veterinary School is located in the area.

Notable people

See also

 Massacre of El Ouffia (6 April 1832)

References

External links 
 The official website of the town of El-Harrach 

Suburbs of Algiers
Communes of Algiers Province
Algiers Province